Hennessey Performance Engineering is an American hypercar manufacturer and high-performance vehicle creator.

In addition to building the Venom F5 hypercar, the company specializes in 'making fast cars faster' modifying sports cars from several brands including Chevrolet, Dodge, Cadillac, Jeep, Ford, GMC, and Lincoln. Established in 1991 by John Hennessey, their main facility is located 45 minutes west of Houston, Texas in Sealy, Texas. The firm focuses on mechanical component modification for creating high-powered cars. Besides performance automobiles, they also tune pickup trucks and sport utility vehicles such as the Ford Raptor, the Ram TRX and the Jeep Grand Cherokee. They also work on muscle cars like the Ford Mustang, Dodge Charger and Challenger.

Tuner School
In 2008, the Tuner School was founded by the company. It is a private institution dedicated to teach and train high performance vehicle tuner technicians. It is located at Lonestar Motorsports Park, near the Hennessey Performance headquarters. All instructors at this education facility are actual performance tuning mechanics.

Notable cars

Hennessey Venom 650R

The Hennessey Venom 650R is one of the first offerings provided from the tuning company. Available as a package to the 1996 Dodge Viper GTS, the Venom 650R was one of the fastest road legal cars in the world. On the intake, a competition airbox feeds 70-millimeter billet throttle bodies and a port-matched intake manifold. On the exhaust, a set of tuned-length stainless steel headers sent spent gases back to a 3.0-inch stainless exhaust system that retained the stock catalytic converters, but allowed them to be easily bypassed for track day performance. New engine management software increased the idle to 1,000 rpm, disabled the 1-4 skip-shift transmission feature, turned the cooling fans on sooner, and packed recalibrated fuel and ignition curves. Completing the package was the VenomAero carbon fiber body upgrade that reduced weight, added functional brake cooling ducts along with a rear wing and optimized downforce. A Brembo race spec braking system and a Penske adjustable suspension system with 30 variable damping settings were available as an option. The total cost of the package stood at US$108,500 excluding the price of a stock Viper GTS.

Hennessey Venom GT

In 2010, Hennessey Performance revealed the Hennessey Venom GT. Three "World's Fastest Edition" Venom GT coupés were produced in 2014 to commemorate the car's speed record run.

A roadster variant dubbed the Venom GT Spyder was launched in 2012 on the request of Aerosmith lead singer Steven Tyler. It is based on the Lotus Elise and adds  to the curb weight due to structural changes. The production of the Spyder was limited to five units with a one-off Spyder being produced as the "Final edition" model bringing the total to 6 units.

Hennessey Venom F5

The Hennessey Venom F5, successor to the Venom GT, was unveiled at the SEMA Show in Las Vegas, Nevada, on November 1, 2017, with high expectations of its intended world-beating speed record, having a projected 2.0 second  acceleration time and  top speed.
The Venom F5 features a bespoke proprietary 6.6-liter twin-turbocharged V8 engine, making this the company's first in-house engine. Pennzoil and Shell are partners with Hennessey for the project to help reach the  top speed mark. The top speed is claimed to be  through a V-MAX speed-tracking system. Only 24 will be built with each car costing US$1.6 million.

VelociRaptor SUV/Off-Road Truck

The Hennessey VelociRaptor SUV is a luxury off-road full-size SUV modified from the Ford SVT Raptor. The SUV is limited to 30 produced a year, however since its introduction over 400 versions have been made. It uses the same engine Ford uses for the pickup truck version. The second generation version is a Luxury off-road heavy-duty SUV modified from the 2015 Ford Super Duty Lariat Version, with design cues from the Ford Excursion.

As of 2015, the first generation model has been discontinued. In 2018 the Hennessey Ford VelociRaptor 6×6 option was made available, with a 30-inch extended frame and extra axle for a total of six driven wheels.

Hennessey CTS-V

The Hennessey CTS-V is a 2016 Cadillac CTS-V tuned by Hennessey to produce 1000 horsepower.

Hennessey Exorcist
The Hennessey Exorcist is an upgrade package for the Chevrolet Camaro ZL1 offered by Hennessy Special Vehicles. The package includes a high-flow supercharger and intercooler providing 14 psi of boost pressure, custom camshaft, ported cylinder heads, upgraded valvetrain with new springs, lifters, pushrods and valves and long-tube stainless steel exhaust headers with high-flow catalytic converters. The cars equipped with the automatic transmission will require an upgraded transmission at the cost of US$9,950. The optional drag pack includes 315/30-20 rear tires, modifications to the drive shaft, floor jack and tool kit for faster acceleration at the drag strip at the cost of US$8,995. The optional road race pack includes a set of 20 inch light weight Hennessey wheels with Michelin Pilot Sport Cup 2 tires at the cost of US$6,995. The package is available at an additional cost of US$57,455 over the cost of the standard ZL1 for both the manual and automatic versions of the car. The vehicle can directly be ordered from Hennessey Special Vehicles, Chevrolet dealers or the vehicle can be sent to Hennessey Special vehicles by the owners for conversion.

Divisions

Hennessey established the Hennessey Special Vehicles division in 2017, in which it builds the Hennessey Venom GT sports car line-up. The division is tasked to learn from its experiences with the Venom GT and apply it to the newest variation, the Hennessey Venom F5, which will succeed the Venom GT. All vehicles sold under the division are branded as a regular Hennessey model, despite being built by the division.

See also
Hennessey Viper Venom 1000 Twin Turbo – Another car tuned by HPE
Lingenfelter Performance Engineering – A similar company
Vorsteiner – another similar company, specialising in modifying automobiles from European Luxury and High Performance Sports Car brands such as Audi, BMW, Mercedes-Benz, and more. They also have an alloy wheels division.

References

External links

Hennessey Performance Engineering official website
Tuner School official website
Hennessey Special Vehicles official website
Venom GT official website

Automotive motorsports and performance companies
Vehicle manufacturing companies established in 1991
1991 establishments in Texas
Companies based in Houston
Hennessey vehicles
American companies established in 1991
Auto tuning companies